Jimmy Bishop (May 4, 1941 – January 10, 2013) was an American politician. He served as a Democratic member of the Tennessee House of Representatives.

Life and career 
Bishop was born in Henry County, Tennessee, the son of Lucile Goodman and William Bryan Bishop. He was a salesman.

In 1974, Bishop was elected to the Tennessee House of Representatives, serving until 1978.

Bishop died in January 2013 in Memphis, Tennessee, at the age of 71.

References 

1941 births
2013 deaths
People from Henry County, Tennessee
Democratic Party members of the Tennessee House of Representatives
20th-century American politicians